The Elms School is a co-educational private boarding prep school located in Colwall, Herefordshire, England. Including its pre-prep department, it caters for children from 2 to 13 years old. The Interim Headmasters for 2022/23 are David Pearce and Jonathan Bungard, who are members of the Boarding Schools Association and the Independent Association of Prep Schools (IAPS); The Elms was one of the IAPS's founding schools.

History
The Elms was founded in 1614 by Humphrey Walwyn of the Worshipful Company of Grocers, and is the oldest prep school still on its original site. The original school house was based on a farmhouse, built in the 1550s, on the edge of the village of Colwall in the lee of the Malvern Hills.

Although it is often referred to as the oldest prep school in the United Kingdom still located on its original site, according to The Rise of the English Prep School, the official inception date of The Elms as a prep school dates back to only 1867.

In 2014 The Elms School celebrated its 400-year anniversary, and named a new dormitory after the late former Prime Minister Margaret Thatcher. It maintains close links with the Grocers' Company, and receives financial assistance from the company's charitable arm.

Facilities
The school has 150 acres of land, including a farm and a large outdoor arena for riding. As of 2013, The Elms was one of 98 schools in the UK with its own farm. The Elms has herds of Hereford cattle and Gloucester Old Spot pigs, which pupils help to tend, and show at county agricultural shows. Meat from the farm is served in the school canteen and sold to parents. Each class is responsible for tending a garden, and fruits and vegetables they grow are also used in the school kitchens.

Pupils may stable their own ponies at the school. The equestrian programme includes hunting. The school has its own puppy show, where children learn to judge hounds. In 2019, an annual hunt meeting at The Elms School was cancelled due to controversy on social media.

The school also has a sports hall, theatre, swimming pool, astroturf, and science laboratories, as well as sports fields.

Academic life
The Elms is a preparatory school, preparing pupils for Common Entrance and senior school Scholarship examinations, mainly at 13+.  Pupils from the school have moved onto such schools as Cheltenham College, The Cheltenham Ladies' College, Dean Close, Eton, Gordonstoun, Harrow, Shrewsbury, St Marys, Calne and Tudor Hall.

Pupils study all the subjects of a standard curriculum, with the addition of Greek (for some pupils), Latin and Rural Studies.  Pupils are largely taught by a form teacher in the early years, but there is an increasing degree of specialist subject teaching as they move up the school.

Sport
Pupils play Association football, Rugby football, cricket, hockey, netball, rounders, athletics, triathlon and heptathlon. School teams have been successful in County and National level competitions.

Notable alumni
 Stephen Davies, ornithologist
 Sir Peter Gadsden (1929–2006), 652nd Lord Mayor of London
 Quentin Letts (born 1963), journalist and theatre critic
 John Moore (1907–1967), author

References

External links 
 The Elms School Website
 Educational activities of the Grocers' Company
 Information about the school from the Independent Schools Council
 The Elms School Official Facebook Page

1614 establishments in England
Educational institutions established in the 1610s
Preparatory schools in Herefordshire
Private schools in Herefordshire